Christina Linardatou Durán (born 4 March 1988) is a Greek professional boxer. She is a two-time WBO female junior-welterweight champion, having held the title since 2020, and previously in 2019. She also challenged once for the WBC female lightweight title in 2016. As of September 2020, she is ranked as the world's best active female junior-welterweight by The Ring and third BoxRec.

Career

Early career
Born in Santiago de los Caballeros, Dominican Republic, Linardatou moved to Greece when she was a kid. Later, she started to practice boxing.

Professional career
After some fights in Greece, Linardatou moved to Dominican Republic to start her professional career.

On 4 June 2016, Linardatou made her first attempt at a world championship, challenging Delfine Persoon for the WBC female lightweight title at Sporthal Schiervelde in Roeselare, Belgium, losing by unanimous decision.

her first championship fight, Linardatou lost for the WBC lightweight title against Delfine Persoon. The .

On 24 March 2019, Linardatou won the vacant WBO female junior welterweight title, after beating Kandi Wyatt via technical knockout in round six. This was the first world championship bout held in Greece.

On 7 June 2019, Linardatou made the first defense of her title, defeating Deanha Hobbs by unanimous decision over ten rounds in a bout held at the Galatsi Olympic Hall in Athens.

Professional boxing record

External links

References

1988 births
Living people
Light-welterweight boxers
Greek women boxers
People from Santiago de los Caballeros
World Boxing Organization champions